David or Dave Barr may refer to:

David G. Barr (born 1895), US Army Major General
David Barr (politician) (born 1946), Australian politician
David Barr (Canadian Forces officer) (born 1959), Canadian military officer
Dave Barr (American football) (born 1972), American football quarterback
Dave Barr (golfer) (born 1952), Canadian golfer
Dave Barr (ice hockey) (born 1960), Canadian ice hockey player
Dave Barr (motorcyclist) (born 1953), American veteran and motorcyclist who circumnavigated the globe despite having both legs amputated
David Barr (English cricketer) (born 1970), English cricketer
David Barr (Irish cricketer) (born 1993), Irish cricketer
David Barr (playwright), American writer and playwright
David Barr (HIV/AIDS activist), founding member of Treatment Action Group

See also
David Barr Kirtley (born 1977), American short-story writer
David Barr Chilton (born 1961), Canadian author